Cali Underground is an annual rock music festival celebrated in Cali, Colombia. Bands as Angelcorpus, Ultimos Romanticos, Astreas Domains, Desdenia, Deadline and Orus have played at this festival.

History 

The festival first ran in 2004, with a few hundred audience members, and a few relatively unknown bands, but in the following years the number of visitors increased to several thousand. After obtaining the support of the Secretaria de Cultura y Turismo de Santiago de Cali and private enterprises like Parquesoft and Deeplunar the festival has drawn increased attendance.

See also

List of music festivals in Colombia
Music of Colombia

References

External links
 Official Site
 DIARIO ADN  
 Noticia El cuartel del metal 
  Noticia Factor mostaza
 / Noticia El tiempo

Music festivals in Colombia
Music festivals established in 2004
Rock festivals in Colombia